The brown-headed spider monkey (Ateles fusciceps fusciceps) is a critically endangered subspecies of the black-headed spider monkey, a type of New World monkey, found in northwestern Ecuador.

Its type locality is at 1500 m in the Hacienda Chinipamba, Imbabura Province in North-West Ecuador.  It inhabits areas west of the Andes Mountains. Some authorities, such as Froelich (1991), Collins and Dubach (2001) and Nieves (2005), do not recognize the black-headed spider monkey as a distinct species and so treat the brown-headed spider monkey as a subspecies of Geoffroy's spider monkey.

It lives in population densities of 1.2 monkeys per square kilometer. It has a black or brown body and a brown head, while the Colombian spider monkey (A. f. rufiventris) is entirely black with some white on its chin.

The brown-headed spider monkey is critically endangered as a result of habitat loss, due to deforestation, and hunting.

References

Mammals of Ecuador
Spider monkeys
Mammals described in 1866
Taxa named by John Edward Gray